Jeannie Blaylock  is a weekday anchor, alongside Shannon Ogden,  on First Coast News at WTLV/WJXX in Jacksonville, Florida, United States. She is also the "Healthwatch" reporter. Blaylock co-anchors the weeknight 5 and 6 p.m. newscasts of First Coast News.

Blaylock graduated valedictorian from Cape Central High School in Cape Girardeau, Missouri. She holds a BA and triple major in English, communication, and art from William Jewell College in Liberty, Missouri. She graduated summa cum laude in 1982 and completed part of her undergraduate work at Oxford University in Oxford, England. She also studied at the BBC in London.

She started her career in 1982 at KTAB-TV, the CBS affiliate in Abilene, Texas. In 1985, Blaylock began working at WTLV.

She was a minor character in the 1997 film Gold Coast (based on the 1980 novel by Elmore Leonard).

Awards and recognition

Blaylock has received many awards including twelve Emmys, two Edward R. Murrow Awards, and a Peabody. She earned her first Emmy for helping thousands of parents try to keep their children off drugs by showing the tricks her kids use to hide drug usage. She won the Peabody Award in 1994 for her contribution in the creation, in collaboration with Baptist Health, of "Buddy Check 12". She was the first person in Jacksonville to earn a Peabody.

See also
List of Peabody Award winners

References

External links
First Coast News biography
Blaylock's 1985 audition tape

American television journalists
American women television journalists
Television anchors from Jacksonville, Florida
Living people
Year of birth missing (living people)
21st-century American women